Jamming the Voice of the Universe is the debut studio album of Electro Assassin, released in June 1992 by Hyperium Records and Concrete Productions.

Reception 
Matthew Riley of EST called Jamming the Voice of the Universe "a very cultured "debut" release" and "This new incarnation has a noticeably upbeat, fresh approach to its output."

Track listing

Personnel
Adapted from the Jamming the Voice of the Universe liner notes.

Electro Assassin
 Kevin Gould – instruments
 Richard McKinlay – instruments
 Ian Taylor – vocals

Production and design
 Van McCoy (Machine) – design

Release history

References

External links 
 Jamming the Voice of the Universe at Discogs (list of releases)
 Jamming the Voice of the Universe at iTunes

1992 debut albums
Electro Assassin albums